Sutter is a surname.  According to one historical record, one original spelling was Sotter.

People with this surname
Karin Keller-Sutter, Swiss German politician
 Alain Sutter (born 1968), Swiss footballer
Allan Sutter (1914–1988), American Marine Corps Navy Cross recipient
 Beat Sutter (born 1962), Swiss footballer
 Bruce Sutter (1953–2022), American MLB relief pitcher and Baseball Hall of Famer
 Herb Sutter, C++ expert and author, secretary of the ISO/ANSI C++ standards committee
 Joe Sutter (1921–2016), an American aerospace engineer 
 John Augustus Sutter, Sr. (1803–1880), Californian associated with the Gold Rush
 John Augustus Sutter, Jr. (1826–1897), his son, a U.S. Consul to Acapulco, Mexico, and the founder and planner of the City of Sacramento, California
 Merlin Sutter (born 1986), Swiss musician
 Ryan Sutter (born 1974), first "winner" of the TV show The Bachelorette
 Ueli Sutter (born 1947), Swiss cyclist

Suter family (sportspeople) 
 Ryan Suter (born January 21, 1985) is an American professional ice hockey defenseman and alternate captain with the Minnesota Wild of the National Hockey League (NHL).[1] He has also played for the Nashville Predators. His Uncle, Gary Suter also played hockey professionally in the NHL and represented the USA National Team.

Sutter family (sportspeople) 
 Sutter family, a Canadian family that is one of the most famous in the National Hockey League
 Brent Sutter (born 1962), NHL player for the New York Islanders and Chicago Blackhawks
 Brandon Sutter (born 1989), hockey player and son of Brent
 Brian Sutter (born 1956), NHL player for the St. Louis Blues
 Shaun Sutter (born 1980), son of Brian; player in several minor leagues and Europe and now a major junior hockey coach
 Darryl Sutter (born 1958), NHL player for the Chicago Blackhawks
 Brett Sutter (born 1987), hockey player and son of Darryl
 Duane Sutter (born 1960), NHL player for the New York Islanders and Chicago Blackhawks
 Rich Sutter (born 1963), NHL player 
 Ron Sutter (born 1963), NHL player

Fictional characters
Rebecca Sutter, fictional character played by Katie Findlay (List of How to Get Away with Murder characters)

See also
DeSutter
Sutter (disambiguation) (other meanings)

References 

ru:Саттер